"Space Oddity" is a song by David Bowie, the first track from his eponymous 1969 album.

Space Oddity may also refer to:

 David Bowie (1969 album), the above-mentioned 1969 album by David Bowie reissued as Space Oddity from the 1972 edition onwards
 "Space Oddity"  The First Music video recorded in space by Astronaut Chris Hadfield, a cover of David Bowie's song. See Music in space for more details
 "Space Oddity" a short film by Eduardo Cemano, "Silver Phoenix" winner at the 1970 Atlanta International Film Festival
 "A Space Oddity", a fourth season episode of the TV series Code Lyoko
 "A Space Oddity", a ninth season episode of the TV series CSI: Crime Scene Investigation
 Worms: A Space Oddity, a turn based artillery game for the Nintendo Wii
 Space Oddity (film), a 2022 sci-fic romantic comedy